Janki Goud  is an Indian judoka. She won a bronze medal at the 2017 Judo Asian & Oceania Championship held by the International Blind Sports Federation at Tashkent, Uzbekistan. She was congratulated by chief minister Shivraj Singh Chouhan in a tweet.

In 2016 and 2017, she won silver and gold medals respectively at the 4th and 5th National Judo Championship for Deaf & Blind. She won the gold medal at the 6th National Blind and Deaf Judo Championship, held in Lucknow, Uttar Pradesh in February 2018.

At the age of 5, she lost her sight after contracting measles. As of August 2018, she has been reported to be 23 years old. She received judo and self-defence training from Sightsavers, a nongovernmental organization.

See also 
 List of Indian sportswomen
 List of blind people

References 

Living people
Sportspeople with a vision impairment
Indian female judoka
People from Madhya Pradesh
Sportswomen from Madhya Pradesh
21st-century Indian women
21st-century Indian people
Year of birth missing (living people)
Indian female martial artists
Indian blind people